Hongmao is a town of Qiongzhong Li and Miao Autonomous County in the centre of Hainan, located  west of the county seat and situated along China National Highway 224. , it had 2 residential communities and 11 villages under its administration.

See also 
 List of township-level divisions of Hainan
 Luokan, Hainan

References 

Township-level divisions of Hainan
Qiongzhong Li and Miao Autonomous County